Avon is a city in Bon Homme County, South Dakota, United States. The population was 586 at the 2020 census.

History
Avon was founded in 1879. The community owes its name to Avon, New York, the hometown of an early postmaster. Construction of the railroad prompted the town to move to its current site in 1900.

Geography
Avon is located at  (43.006780, -98.059092). The community is served by South Dakota Highway 50, which runs east-west in the northern part of town.

Avon has been assigned the ZIP code 57315, and the FIPS place code 02900.

Demographics

2010 census
As of the census of 2010, there were 590 people, 256 households, and 152 families residing in the city. The racial makeup of the city was 94.1% White, 3.1% Native American, 0.2% Asian, 1.0% from other races, and 1.7% from two or more races. Hispanic or Latino of any race were 2.0% of the population.

There were 256 households, of which 28.5% had children under the age of 18 living with them, 52.0% were married couples living together, 5.9% had a female householder with no husband present, 1.6% had a male householder with no wife present, and 40.6% were non-families. 37.9% of all households were made up of individuals, and 22.6% had someone living alone who was 65 years of age or older. The average household size was 2.30 and the average family size was 3.07.

The median age in the city was 39.8 years. 28.3% of residents were under the age of 18; 6.1% were between the ages of 18 and 24; 20.9% were from 25 to 44; 24.6% were from 45 to 64; and 20% were 65 years of age or older. The gender makeup of the city was 47.6% male and 52.4% female.

2000 census
As of the census of 2000, there were 561 people, 272 households, and 162 families residing in the city. The population density was 873.2 people per square mile (338.4/km2). There were 318 housing units at an average density of 495.0 per square mile (191.8/km2). The racial makeup of the city was 97.86% White and 2.14% Native American. Hispanic or Latino of any race were 0.36% of the population.

There were 272 households, out of which 22.8% had children under the age of 18 living with them, 53.7% were married couples living together, 4.8% had a female householder with no husband present, and 40.1% were non-families. 39.0% of all households were made up of individuals, and 28.7% had someone living alone who was 65 years of age or older. The average household size was 2.06 and the average family size was 2.75.

In the city, the population was spread out, with 20.1% under the age of 18, 5.0% from 18 to 24, 21.7% from 25 to 44, 20.3% from 45 to 64, and 32.8% who were 65 years of age or older. The median age was 48 years. For every 100 females, there were 90.8 males. For every 100 females age 18 and over, there were 82.9 males.

The median income for a household in the city was $27,656, and the median income for a family was $35,000. Males had a median income of $27,500 versus $16,607 for females. The per capita income for the city was $16,089. About 8.1% of families and 8.2% of the population were below the poverty line, including 9.9% of those under age 18 and 7.9% of those age 65 or over.

Education
Avon Public Schools are part of the Avon School District. The district has one elementary school, one middle school and one high school. Students attend Avon High School.

Notable person
South Dakota Senator and 1972 Democratic presidential candidate George McGovern was born and raised in Avon until he was six, when his family moved to Mitchell, South Dakota.

References

External links

Cities in Bon Homme County, South Dakota
Cities in South Dakota